The 63rd Tank Regiment is an inactive tank regiment of the Italian Army based in Cordenons in Friuli Venezia Giulia. Originally the regiment, like all Italian tank units, was part of the infantry, but on 1 June 1999 it became part of the cavalry. Operationally the regiment was last assigned to the Mechanized Brigade "Mantova".

History

World War II 
The regiment's history began in Italian Libya in spring 1940 when the XXI Assault Tanks Battalion "Trombi" raised the LXII Assault Tanks Battalion and LXIII Assault Tanks Battalion. Both battalions were intended as supports for the two divisions deployed in Cyrenaica: the LXII for the 62nd Infantry Division "Marmarica" and the LXIII for the 63rd Infantry Division "Cirene". All three battalions were equipped with obsolete L3/35 tankettes. On 29 August 1940 both battalions were assigned to the I Tankers Group of the Libyan Tank Command under General Valentino Babini.

In September 1940 the battalion participated in the Italian invasion of Egypt and only three months later it was annihilated on 11 December 1940 near Buq Buq during the Battle of Sidi Barrani. The battalion was officially declared dissolved during January 1941.

Cold War 
On 2 December 1958 the army raised the III Tank Battalion equipped with M47 Patton tanks in Visco for the 59th Infantry Regiment "Calabria". On 1 April 1961 the III Tank Battalion was renamed LXIII Tank Battalion and received the traditions of the World War II battalion. On 1 March 1964 the battalion left the "Calabria" regiment and came under direct command of the Infantry Division "Mantova". On 25 July 1968 the battalion moved from Visco to Cordenons.

63rd Tank Battalion "M.O. Fioritto" 
On 1 November 1975, as part of the 1975 army reform, the LXIII Tank Battalion was renamed 63rd Tank Battalion "M.O. Fioritto", which was granted a new flag and a coat of arms on 12 November 1976 by decree 846 of the President of the Italian Republic Giovanni Leone. Tank and armored battalions created during the 1975 army reform were all named for officers, soldiers and partisans, who were posthumously awarded Italy's highest military honor the Gold Medal of Military Valour during World War II. The 63rd Tank Battalion's name commemorated 4th Tank Infantry Regiment Second Lieutenant Vincenzo Fioritto, who was killed in action on 10 September 1943 during the attempt to defend Rome against the German Operation Achse. Equipped with Leopard 1A2 main battle tanks the battalion joined the Mechanized Brigade "Isonzo".

For its conduct and work after the 1976 Friuli earthquake the battalion was awarded a Bronze Medal of Army Valour, which was affixed to the battalion's flag and added to the battalion's coat of arms.

On 1 October 1986 the Infantry Division "Mantova" was disbanded and to retain the historically significant name "Mantova" the Mechanized Brigade "Isonzo" was renamed Mechanized Brigade "Mantova". On 12 September 1991 the battalion was elevated to regiment without changing size or organization; initially named 63rd Tank Regiment "M.O. Fioritto" the regiment dropped the honorific title exactly one year later and was now named 63rd Tank Regiment.

On 31 July 1995 the regiment transferred from the Mechanized Brigade "Mantova" to the 132nd Armored Brigade "Ariete" and on 30 November of the same year the 63rd Tank Regiment was renamed 132nd Tank Regiment. After having ceased its colors the flag of the 63rd was transferred to the Shrine of the Flags in the Vittoriano in Rome.

References

Tank Regiments of Italy